Robin Pröpper (born 23 September 1993) is a Dutch professional footballer who plays as a centre back for Twente in the Eredivisie. He formerly played for De Graafschap.

Personal
He is the younger brother of Vitesse-midfielder Davy Pröpper.

Career statistics

References

External links
 
 Voetbal International profile 

1993 births
Living people
Footballers from Arnhem
Association football midfielders
Dutch footballers
De Graafschap players
Heracles Almelo players
FC Twente players
Eredivisie players
Eerste Divisie players